Peter David Williams (born 9 February 1942) is an Australian former cricketer. A right-handed batsman and an occasional wicket-keeper, he played four first-class cricket matches for Victoria between 1965 and 1966.

See also
 List of Victoria first-class cricketers

References

External links
 

1942 births
Living people
Australian cricketers
Victoria cricketers
Cricketers from Melbourne
People from Brighton, Victoria